San Diego de los Baños is a consejo popular ("popular council") and urban settlement in Los Palacios, Cuba. As of 2012 it had a population of 3,306.

Geography
The consejo popular is located north-east of the municipality. It borders Entronque de Palacios and Paso Quemado consejos populares.

Demographics 
In 1838 the settlement had 72 houses, 5 assorted stores, 4 drug stores, 2 tobacco manufacturing businesses, 1 bakery, 1 pool cafe, 1 shoe store, 1 carpenter's, 1 school, and a population of 119. In 1991 they had a population of 2,444 and in 2002 it grew to 3,239.

References

Populated places in Pinar del Río Province